Forstegg Castle is a ruined castle in the municipality of Sennwald of the Canton of St Gallen in Switzerland.  It was built around 1200 by the Barons of Sax/Misox, was abandoned in the 19th century and fell into ruin in 1894.

See also
 List of castles in Switzerland

References

External links

 
 Information about the castle on www.dickemauern.de

Castles in the canton of St. Gallen